( "The Olsen Gang Takes the Gold") is a 1972 Norwegian comedy-crime film of the Olsenbanden film series, directed by Knut Bohwim.

Plot

The gang is now up to finding an old bunker from World War II, in the southern parts of Norway. after the leader Egon has found a map leading to the old General's treasure, a suitcase of dollar bills and a safe containing gold bars. As they meet up and ready themselves, Egon claims that he is the only one who knows where this treasure is.

At the same time, a local girl and blacksmith's daughter, Karin, allies herself with an international smuggler, wanted by Interpol. Karin claims she also knows the bunker's location, because her father built it. The villain, Rico (Ole-Jørgen Nilsen), is seen driving around in a Toyota Celica ST 2000. The smuggler initially says he wants to share the treasure with her as long as she shows him the location.

The Olsen Gang steals a red Ford Transit and travels down to Sørlandet. Halfway, the van breaks down, and it appears to be a worn out head gasket. A scrap seller's towing truck picks them up and tows their van to the impound, where they sell it to the scrap seller, and it is pressed flat. The Olsen Gang then borrows the scrap seller's Toyota Crown, and intends to go the rest of the way down to the bunker. They find out that the access corridor to the bunker is filled with water, and they need scuba gear. They buy the scuba gear with the money they initially got from the scrap seller when they sold the van, and they are once again broke.

They locate the bunker, but it is sealed with a thick wall of concrete. They try to blow their way through, but dynamite cannot make a hole in the wall, so they try to hack their way through with a miner's pickaxe.

The villain however, is armed with a harpoon and he tries to shoot them, but he is accidentally knocked out by one of the Olsen Gang members. He then retaliates by kidnapping Basse, the son of the gang member 'Kjell'. The clever boy manages to pull the carpet away from under the villain's feet, causing him to fall. He then escapes.

The gang is now back, but this time with a two-stroke gasoline-driven pneumatic drill. It is working better this time, but the vibrations from the drill is triggering a secret defense mechanism set up by the Germans 30 years before the movie takes place (1972).

This device, a huge yellow grenade, which runs on a trail in the ceiling is constructed to travel along the rails in the roof and torpedo the concrete wall to kill the intruders. Benny and Egon, busy holding the drill steady cannot hear or see the grenade sliding over their heads, and Kjell tries to warn them, without luck.

The drill then runs out of gasoline, and they hear the noise from the grenade traveling along the railing. They jump into the water-filled corridor to take cover, and the grenade impacts the wall, blowing a hole. The explosion also causes a headquarters building belonging to the Norwegian Army built exactly over the bunker to blow up, scaring a lieutenant standing on a nearby wharf, causing him to fall in the water.

Inside the bunker, there's a painting of Hitler and a decked table with silver forks and knives, along with nazi hats and symbols, and, of course, the vault containing the gold and the money.

Egon, the skilled vault code cracker opens the safe and retrieves the goods, and they make their escape from a small ventilation hole. On their escape down to an awaiting boat, Rico catches up with them, firing his Browning at them, but they get away quickly. Rico catches another boat and pursuits them. He is, however, having engine trouble before he is able to reach the shore, and is delayed.

The Olsen Gang, now on the mainland, still with the suitcase filled with dollar bills, finds their awaiting escape car, the scrap seller's Toyota Crown, but with Kjell's wife, Valborg (Aud Schønemann) missing, even though she was supposed to be in the car, waiting.

But they suddenly hear the whining screech of car tyres, and Rico is on his way in the Celica. There's a wild car chase around the town, but eventually, Rico gets stuck in a puddle of mud. The gang is happy and is heading for the airport to travel to Majorca. Typically, 17 minutes before takeoff and still 13 kilometres away from the airport, their car runs out of gasoline, and the scrap seller shows up to tow them back to the impound, where Valborg and Basse is. The gang then heads for the town to the bank to exchange the dollars into Norwegian kroner.

Meanwhile, the Rico and his Celica shows up at the scrap seller, threatening Karin with a gun. The smuggler wants all the gold for himself, but he doesn't notice that his car, with the gold inside, is parked directly under the heavy concrete block utilized as a crusher to crush cars. Just as he is about an inch away from the crusher, it drops down, flattening the car. He is then given a few kroner to travel home by train, and he is gone.

Meanwhile, the gang, without Egon, who is at the bank exchanging money, celebrates with cake at a restaurant. Basse, the son, then accidentally flips a glass of Coca-Cola over a dollar bill lying at the table. Valborg then tries to dry the bill with a napkin, but the water paint on the bill then gets washed away. Basse then utters "That's what I thought. They are all false".

In the background, a police car, with the arrested Egon can be heard, and the rest of the gang travels back to Oslo.

External links

1972 films
Films directed by Knut Bohwim
1970s Norwegian-language films
Olsenbanden films
1970s crime comedy films
1972 comedy films